Transmembrane protein 255A is a protein that is encoded by the TMEM255A gene. TMEM255A is often referred to as family with sequence similarity 70, member A (FAM70A). The TMEM255A protein is transmembrane and is predicted to be located the nuclear envelope of eukaryote organisms.

Gene 

The TMEM25A gene (often referred to as Family with Sequence Similarity 70 Member A; FAM70A) is located on Xq24, spanning 60,555 base pairs. TMEM255A is flanked by the genes ATPase Na+/K+ transporting family member beta 4 (ATP1B4) and NFKB activating protein pseudogene 1 (NKAPP1).

mRNA 

There are three variants of the transcript seen, where isoform 1 is the longest. The 5’- and 3’- UTRs of the mRNA spans 227 and 2207 base pairs, respectively, and are predicted to contain several stem-loops. The mRNA is 3512 base pairs long and the gene consists of 9 exons.

Protein 

The longest protein encoded for is isoform 1, which spans 349 amino acids, and is predicted to have a molecular weight at 38 kDa and isoelectric point at pH 7.89. Compared to the average vertebrate protein, TMEM255A is rich in aspartic acid, isoleucine, proline and tyrosine, and relatively poor in glutamic acid and lysine. No charge clusters have been found in this protein.

The protein is predicted to be post-translationally modified by phosphorylation and glycosylation. The protein is predicted to have four transmembrane domains in the nuclear membrane. The structure of the protein is predicted to be helical in the transmembrane domains. Disulfide bonds are predicted to be found in the region in between transmembrane domains 3 and 4, which indicates that this particular region is located in the nucleoplasm.

Expression 

TMEM255A is predicted to be most abundantly expressed in nerve, brain, testis, ovary, thymus and kidney. The protein is expressed in a variety of tissues, but at relatively moderate levels.

Regulation of expression 

Both the 5' and 3' Untranslated Regions (UTRs) are predicted to consist of several stem-loops. The 3' UTR also contain a conserved miRNA target site (amino acids 22-29). Phosphorylation and glycosylation sites have also been predicted in TMEM255A.

Interacting proteins 

Affinity Capture MS experimentally predicts that TMEM255A interacts with ten different proteins; Ankyrin repeat domain 13D (ANKRD13D), Collagen beta (1-O) galactosyltransferase 2 (COLGALT2), Grancalcin (GCA), Itchy E3 ubiquitin protein ligase (ITCH), Potassium channel tetramerization domain containing 2 (KCTD2), Neural precursor cell expressed developmentally down-regulated 4 (NEDD4), SEC24 family member B (SEC24D), Ubiquitin associated and SH3 domain containing B (UBASH3D), WW domain containing E3 ubiquitin protein ligase 1 and 2 (WWP1, WWP2) - most of these are included in ubiquitination processes, transcription regulation and protein degradation.

Clinical significance 

TMEM255A is predicted to be highly expressed in peroxisome proliferator-activated receptor γ coactivator 1α-upregulated glioblastoma multiforme cells (specific gene function not yet fully established). Ongoing research is investigating the possibility of TMEM255A to be used in personalized immunotherapy.

Homology 

There is one known paralog for TMEM255A, called TMEM255B, which is found on chromosome 13 (position 13q34). TMEM255A is only found in the kingdom of animalia, and its most distant homolog is found in invertebrata (i.e. Saccoglossus kowalenskii).

References 

Transmembrane proteins
Phylogenetics